The Engagement Skills Trainer is a simulator that provides marksmanship training and trains soldiers on virtually all aspects of firearms training from calibrating weapons, to weapons qualification, to collective fire scenarios in numerous environments.

Users 

: The Lebanese Armed Forces operate five 10-lanes systems.

See also
Boot Camp

References

External links 
Cubic: EST-2000 Virtual Marksmanship Training

Simulation
Military education and training in the United States